Robert James Goddard (22 November 1898 – 1968) was an English footballer who played in the Football League for Bristol City.

References

1898 births
1968 deaths
English footballers
Association football goalkeepers
English Football League players
Bristol City F.C. players
Reading F.C. players